The Legislative Assembly of Mato Grosso do Sul (Portuguese: Assembleia Legislativa de Mato Grosso do Sul) is the legislative body of the government of the state of Mato Grosso do Sul in Brazil.

Governed by the 1969 Constitution , the ALMS came from the first Constituent State Assembly of Mato Grosso do Sul, created on January 1, 1979 by the then president of the republic Ernesto Geisel, as part of complementary law 31, which dismembered the southern portion from the state of Mato Grosso to create a new state. On June 13, 1979, the state constitution was enacted, which gave the house its current name.

Years later, following the determination of the Federal Constitution of 1988, the Legislative Assembly, invested with Constituent Power, elaborated the second Magna Carta, promulgated on October 5, 1989. From the foundation until today there were 10 legislatures, with 18 parliamentarians at the beginning and since the second legislature there are 24.

Legislatures 
1st Legislature: 1979–1983
2nd Legislature: 1983–1987
3rd Legislature: 1987–1991
4th Legislature: 1991–1995
5th Legislature: 1995–1999
6th Legislature: 1999–2003
7th Legislature: 2003–2007
8th Legislature: 2007–2011
9th Legislature: 2011–2015
10th Legislature: 2015–2019
11th Legislature: 2019–2023

References

State legislatures of Brazil
Politics of Mato Grosso do Sul